TIFFE may refer to:

 TIFFE, Thermal systems Integration For Fuel Economy, an automobile air conditioning system
 TIFFE, Tokyo International Financial Futures Exchange (now Tokyo Financial Exchange)

See also
 Tifi (disambiguation)